Cédric Revol (born 22 July 1994) is a French judoka.

He is the bronze medallist of the 2018 Judo Grand Slam Paris in the -60 kg category.

At the 2021 Judo Grand Slam Abu Dhabi held in Abu Dhabi, United Arab Emirates, he won one of the bronze medals in his event.

References

External links
 
 
 

1994 births
Living people
French male judoka
21st-century French people